Big Bear Valley is a valley in San Bernardino County, California, United States. The valley, in the San Bernardino Mountains, includes Big Bear Lake, Big Bear City, Fawnskin, Holcomb Valley, Sugarloaf, Erwin Lake, Baldwin Lake, Bluff Lake and Lake Williams.

History 
The Spanish colonizers arrived to the valley in the eighteenth century and encountered people who they referred to as "Serranos" in the valley. The Serranos had established a few permanent settlements in the mountains, and also lived in the area during the summer months of the year. They may have moved into the area some 3,000 years prior.

References